The Gaston Gazette is an American, English-language daily newspaper based in Gastonia, North Carolina. The newspaper was owned by Freedom Communications until 2012, when Freedom sold its Florida and North Carolina papers to Halifax Media Group. In 2015, Halifax was acquired by New Media Investment Group, which was merged and became Gannett in 2019.

Its editorial position is generally conservative, and sometimes libertarian.  Among the syndicated columnists whose columns it runs are Thomas Sowell, Walter Williams, and Tibor Machan.

Overview
The Gazette primarily serves Gastonia and Gaston County and the surrounding counties of Lincoln County in North Carolina and York County in South Carolina.

The Gazette partners with WSOC-TV (Channel 9, an ABC affiliate) in nearby Charlotte.

The Gaston Gazette is a member of the North Carolina Press Association.

The Gaston Gazette has a Facebook page for sharing news and interacting with readers.

History
The Gaston Gazette was founded in 1880.  The newspaper has had several names:
 The Gaston Gazette. (Gastonia, N.C.) 1989-current
 The Gastonia Gazette. (Gastonia, N.C.) 1947-1989
 Gastonia Daily Gazette. (Gastonia, N.C.) 1919-1947
 The Daily Gazette. (Gastonia, N.C.) 1919-1919
 The Gastonia Gazette. (Gastonia, Gaston Co., N.C.) 1880-1919

See also

 List of newspapers in North Carolina

References

External links
 Official mobile website

Daily newspapers published in North Carolina
Gastonia, North Carolina
Newspapers established in 1880
Daily newspapers published in the United States
Gannett publications
1880 establishments in North Carolina